The Midway-class was a class of three United States Navy aircraft carriers. The lead ship, was commissioned in September 1945 and decommissioned in 1992.  was commissioned in October 1945, and taken out of service in 1977.  was commissioned in April 1947, and decommissioned in 1990.

History

1940s
The resulting calculations showed that the effect would be a reduction of air group size—the resulting ship would have an air group of 64, compared to 90-100 for the standard Essex-class fleet carriers. As it progressed, the design also became heavily influenced by the wartime experience of the Royal Navy's armored carriers:

The concept went to finding a larger carrier that could support both deck armor and a sufficiently large air group. The weight-savings needed to armor the flight deck were achieved by removing the planned cruiser-caliber battery of  guns and reducing the 5-inch antiaircraft battery from dual to single mounts. Unlike the Royal Navy's aircraft carriers, for which the armored deck was part of the ship structure, the Midway class retained their "strength deck" at the hangar deck level and the armored flight deck was part of the superstructure. They would be the last USN carriers to be so designed; the immense size of the succeeding  supercarriers would require a new deep-hulled design carrying the strength deck at the flight deck level to produce a stronger and lighter hull.

While the Essex-class carriers had eight main engineering compartments, the Midway-class had 26, including twelve boiler rooms well off the centerline and four widely separated engine rooms. More extensive use of electric arc-welding than in previous warships reduced the weight by about 10 percent of what would have been required for riveted structural assembly.

The resulting Midway-class carriers were very large, with the ability to accommodate more planes than any other carrier in the U.S. fleet (30–40 more aircraft than the Essex class). In their original configuration, the Midway-class ships had an airwing of up to 130 aircraft. It was soon realized that the coordination of so many planes was beyond the effective command and control ability of one ship.  However, their size did allow these ships to more easily accommodate the rapid growth in aircraft size and weight that took place in the early jet age. The forward flight deck was designed for launching 13-ton aircraft; and the aft flight deck was designed for landing 11-ton aircraft, assuming in-flight expenditure of fuel and ordnance.

While the resulting ships featured excellent protection and unprecedented airwing size, they also had several undesirable characteristics. Internally, the ships were very cramped and crowded. Freeboard was unusually low for such large carriers; in heavy seas, they shipped large amounts of water (only partially mitigated by the fitting of a hurricane bow during the SCB-110/110A upgrades) and corkscrewed in a manner that hampered landing operations. The follow-up Forrestal-class featured a deeper hull that had more freeboard and better seakeeping.

In contrast with the earlier ,  and -classes, the beam (width) of the Midway-class carriers meant that they could not pass through the Panama Canal.

Although they were intended to augment the US Pacific fleet during World War II, the lead ship of the class, was not commissioned until 10 September 1945, eight days after the Surrender of Japan.

While Midway and Coral Sea followed the US Navy's policy of naming aircraft carriers after battles (two Casablanca-class escort carriers gave up their names for the larger ships) USS Franklin D. Roosevelt inaugurated the policy of naming aircraft carriers after former US Presidents that the US Navy generally follows today.

1950s
None of the class went on war cruises during the Korean War. As the three ships became essential to the Navy's strategic nuclear weapons role in Europe, they were mainly deployed to the Atlantic and Mediterranean. Until the availability of the Forrestal class, they were the premier commands sought by senior naval aviators. They were "admiral makers" for many of their commanding officers including future CNOs George Whelan Anderson Jr. and David L. McDonald. 

During the 1950s, Midway and Franklin D. Roosevelt underwent the SCB-110 modernization program (similar to SCB-125 for the Essex class), which added angled decks, steam catapults, mirror landing systems, and other modifications that allowed them to operate a new breed of large, heavy naval jets. Coral Sea had a variant modernization program called SCB-110A with an angled deck 3 degrees greater than the other two.

1960s
All three of the Midway class made combat deployments in the Vietnam War.  deployed to the Gulf of Tonkin six times,  deployed on three occasions, and  made one combat deployment before returning to the Mediterranean.

In the late 1960s, Midway underwent an extensive modernization and reconstruction program under SCB 101.66, which proved to be controversial and expensive and thus was not repeated on the other ships. While $82 million had been budgeted for the modernization, the actual cost was $202 million, in comparison to $277 million for simultaneous construction of the brand-new .

1970s
By the 1970s, Franklin D. Roosevelt and Coral Sea were showing their age. All three retained the McDonnell Douglas F-4 Phantom II in their air wings, being too small to operate the new Grumman F-14 Tomcat fleet defense fighter or the S-3 Viking anti-submarine jet. In 1977, Franklin D. Roosevelt was decommissioned. On her final deployment, Roosevelt embarked AV-8 Harrier jump jets to test the concept of including VSTOL aircraft in a carrier air wing.

1980s
Coral Sea was rescued from imminent decommissioning by the election of Ronald Reagan in 1980. Reagan's proposed 600-ship Navy gave the remaining ships a new lease on life. Coral Sea underwent extensive refits to address the ship's poor condition. When the McDonnell Douglas F/A-18 Hornet became operational in the mid-1980s, the Navy quickly deployed them to the Midway and Coral Sea to replace the older F-4s. A 1986 refit for Midway removed her 6" armor belt and bulged her hull to try to increase freeboard. While successful in this regard, the bulges also resulted in a dangerously fast rolling period that prevented Midway from operating aircraft in heavy seas. The bulging was therefore not repeated on Coral Sea.

1990s
The Reagan era reprieve could not last. In 1990, Coral Sea, which had long since earned the nickname "Ageless Warrior", was decommissioned. Midway had one last war in which to participate, and was one of the six aircraft carriers deployed by the U.S. against Iraq during Operation Desert Storm. A few months after the campaign, the last of the class left Navy service.

Coral Sea was slowly scrapped in Baltimore as legal and environmental troubles continually delayed her fate. Midway spent five years in the mothball fleet at Bremerton, Washington before being taken over by a museum group. The ship is now open to the public as a museum in San Diego, California.

Ships in class

Hull codes;
CV - Fleet/Multi-purpose carrier
CVA - Attack carrier
CVB - Large carrier

See also
 List of aircraft carriers
 List of aircraft carriers of the United States Navy
 Naval aviation

References

External links

Aircraft carrier classes
 
 Midway-class aircraft carriers
 Midway-class aircraft carriers